The Joseon Tongsinsa were goodwill missions sent intermittently, at the request of the resident Japanese authority, by Joseon dynasty Korea to Japan. The Korean noun identifies a specific type of diplomatic delegation and its chief envoys.  From the Joseon diplomatic perspective, the formal description of a mission as a tongsinsa signified that relations were largely "normalized," as opposed to missions that were not called tongsinsa.

Diplomatic envoys were sent to the Muromachi shogunate and to Toyotomi Hideyoshi between 1392 and 1590.  Similar missions were dispatched to the Tokugawa shogunate in Japan between 1607 and 1811. After the 1811 mission, another mission was prepared, but it was delayed four times and ultimately cancelled due to domestic turmoil in Japan that resulted in the establishment of the Meiji Restoration in Japan, after which Japanese relations with Korea took a markedly different tone.

History
Starting in 1392, many diplomatic missions were sent from the Joseon court to Japan. Not less than 70 envoys were dispatched to Kyoto and Osaka before the beginning of Japan's Edo period. The formal arrival of serial missions from Korea to Japan were considered important affairs; and these events were widely noted and recorded.

Only the largest formal diplomatic missions sent by the Joseon court to Japan were called tongsinsa in Korean.  The term tongsinsa may be misused to refer to the practice of unilateral relations, not the international relations of mutual Joseon-Japanese contacts and communication. Up through the end of the 16th century, four embassies to Japan were called "communication envoys" or tongsinsa – in 1428, 1439, 1443 and 1590.  After 1607, nine tonsingsa missions were sent to Japan up through 1811.

The unique pattern of these diplomatic exchanges evolved from models established by the Chinese, but without denoting any predetermined relationship to China or to the Chinese world order.

In the Edo period of Japanese history, these diplomatic missions were construed as benefiting the Japanese as legitimizing propaganda for the bakufu (Tokugawa shogunate) and as a key element in an emerging manifestation of Japan's ideal vision of the structure of an international order with Edo as its center.

After the Japanese invasion of the Korean peninsula (1592–1598), a new phase of diplomatic relations began.  The formal embassies were preceded by preliminary negotiations which began in 1600, shortly after news of the Toyotomi defeat at the Battle of Sekigahara was received by the Joseon Court.

As an initial gesture in a process of re-establishing diplomatic relations and as an earnest of future progress, some Joseon prisoners were released at Tsushima Island.  In response, a small group of messengers under the leadership of Yu Jeong were sent to Kyoto to investigate further.  With the assistance of Sō Yoshitomo, an audience with Tokugawa Ieyasu was arranged at Fushimi Castle in Kyoto. In 1604, Yu Jeong confirmed the Joseon interest in further developing relations; the Tokugawa shōgun reciprocated by releasing 1,390 prisoners-of-war.

15th–16th century diplomatic ventures
In the 15th and 16th centuries, the Joseon court labeled four large-scale diplomatic missions to Japan as  "communication envoys" or tongsinsa – in 1428, 1439, 1443 and 1590.

In Japan's Muromachi period (1336–1573) and Azuchi–Momoyama period (1568–1603), these Joseon-Japanese diplomatic contacts were considered important events.

{| class="wikitable" 
|- style="background:#efefef"
! scope="col" width=8%  | Year
! scope="col" width=10% | Korean monarch
! scope="col" width=26% | Joseon chief envoy
! scope="col" width=10% | Japanese shōgun
! scope="col" width=48% | Official purpose
|- align="center"
|1428
|Sejong
|Bak Seo-saeng
|Ashikaga Yoshinori
|align="left" | Condolences on the death of Yoshimochi, Congratulations on the succession of Yoshinori
|- align="center"
|1439 
|Sejong
|Go Deuk-jong
|Ashikaga Yoshinori
|align="left" | Neighborly relations, suppression of the waegu (wakō)
|- align="center"
|1443
|Sejong
|Byeon Hyo-mun
|Ashikaga Yoshimasa
|align="left" | Condolences on the death of Yoshinori, congratulations on the succession of Yoshikatsu
|- align="center"
|1590
|Seonjo
|Hwang Yun-gil<ref>Rutt, Richard et al. (2003).  Korea: a Historical and Cultural Dictionary, p. 190.]</ref>
|Toyotomi Hideyoshi
|align="left" | Congratulations on the unification of Hideyoshi
|- align="center"
|}

Hideyoshi's invasions

Diplomacy was set aside in 1592 when Japanese armies invaded Joseon territory.  The ruptured bilateral relations were not restored immediately after the death of Hideyoshi in 1598; but the invading forces gradually withdrew from occupied land on the Korean peninsula.

17th–19th century diplomatic ventures
In the 17th, 18th and 19th centuries, the Joseon leaders sent twelve large-scale delegations to Japan, but not all were construed as "tongsinsa" envoys. The embassies consisted of 400 to 500 delegates; and these missions arguably contributed to the political and cultural development of Japan in addition to the range of ways in which bi-lateral relations were affected.

The 1607, 1617 and 1624 delegations were explicitly identified by the Joseon court as "Reply and Prisoner Repatriation Envoys," which were construed as less formal than a tongsinsa or "communication envoy."   The use of the term "tongsinsa" signified that relations had been "normalized;"

Unlike the missions during the early Joseon era, Japan did not dispatch generals to greet the later Joseon missions, and only Joseon dispatched missions to Japan. However, this was not because diplomatic relations were unilateral or favored Japan – after Hideyoshi's invasions of Korea, Japanese envoys were forbidden from traveling to Seoul, and Japanese missions to Korea were halted at the Japanese residence in Busan (during the invasions, the Japanese invading armies had taken the route used previously by Japanese missions to Seoul from Busan); in addition, the cost of dispatching these missions was shouldered in their entirety by the shogunate in Japan (which, in the context of the three "communication" missions that served to normalize relations between Korea and Japan after 1598, seems equitable), which by some estimates equaled the annual budget of the shogunate in cost.

In Japan's Edo period (1603–1868), the Joseon-Japanese diplomatic contacts were considered significant events, with the exception of the 1811 delegation. The Joseon monarch's ambassador and retinue traveled only as far as Tsushima. The representatives of shōgun Ienari met the mission on the island which is located in the middle of the Korea Strait between the Korean Peninsula and Kyushu. After the 1811 mission, another mission was prepared, but it was delayed four times and ultimately cancelled due to domestic turmoil in Japan that resulted in the establishment of the Meiji Restoration in Japan.

‡ The 1811 tongsinsa was incomplete; the delegation did not travel beyond Tsushima, where the Joseon envoys were met by representatives of the shogunate.

See also
 Joseon missions to Imperial China
 Joseon missions to the Ryukyu Kingdom
 Julius Klaproth 
 Jean-Pierre Abel-Rémusat
 Tsūkō ichiran, mid-19th century text
 Joseon missions to Japan

Notes

References

 Daehwan, Noh.  "The Eclectic Development of Neo-Confucianism and Statecraft from the 18th to the 19th Century," Korea Journal (Winter 2003). 
  한일관계사연구논집편찬위원회. (2005). 통신사・왜관과한일관계 (Han Il kwangyesa yŏngu nonjip, Vol. 6). 경인문화사. .
 Kang, Etsuko Hae-jin. (1997). Diplomacy and Ideology in Japanese-Korean Relations: from the Fifteenth to the Eighteenth Century. Basingstoke, Hampshire; Macmillan. ; 
 Kang, Jae-eun and Suzanne Lee. (2006). The Land of Scholars : Two Thousand Years of Korean Confucianism. Paramus, New Jersey: Homa & Sekey Books. ; OCLC 60931394
 Lewis, James Bryant. (2003). Frontier contact between chosŏn Korea and Tokugawa Japan. London: Routledge. 
 Nussbaum, Louis Frédéric and Käthe Roth. (2005). Japan Encyclopedia. Cambridge: Harvard University Press. ; OCLC 48943301
 Sin, Hyŏng-sik. (2004). A Brief history of Korea. Seoul,: Ewha Womans University Press. ; ; 
 Titsingh, Isaac, ed. (1834). [Siyun-sai Rin-siyo/Hayashi Gahō, 1652], Nipon o daï itsi ran; ou, [https://books.google.com/books?id=18oNAAAAIAAJ&q=nipon+o+dai+itsi+ran  Annales des empereurs du Japon.  Paris: Oriental Translation Fund of Great Britain and Ireland.  OCLC  84067437
 Toby, Ronald P. (1991).  State and Diplomacy in Early Modern Japan: Asia in the Development of the Tokugawa Bakufu. Stanford: Stanford University Press. ; 
 Walker, Brett L.  "Foreign Affairs and Frontiers in Early Modern Japan: A Historiographical Essay," Early Modern Japan. Fall, 2002, pp. 44–62, 124–128.
 Walraven, Boudewijn and Remco E. Breuker. (2007). Korea in the middle: Korean studies and area studies; Essays in Honour of Boudewijn Walraven.	Leiden: CNWS Publications. ; 
 Wiwŏnhoe, Yunesŭkʻo Hanʼguk. (2004). Korean History: Discovery of Its Characteristics and Developments.'' Elizabeth, New Jersey: Hollym.  ;

External links
 Joseon Tongsinsa Cultural Exchange Association ; 
 조선통신사연구 (Journal of Studies in Joseon Tongsinsa) 

Foreign relations of the Joseon dynasty
Feudal Japan
Diplomacy